Conofoline is an alkaloid of the vinca alkaloid  class which is closely related to conophylline. It is found in the leaves of some species in the genus Tabernaemontana, including Tabernaemontana divaricata, and in Ervatamia peduncularis.

See also
 Conolidine
 Conopharyngine

References 

Indolizidines
Indolines
Carbazoles
Heterocyclic compounds with 6 rings
Epoxides
Methoxy compounds